La Carretera (The Road) is a studio album by Julio Iglesias. It was released in 1995. It was nominated for Pop Album of the Year at the Lo Nuestro Awards of 1996.

Track listing
"La Carretera" (Roberto Livi, Rafael Ferro)
"Cosas De La Vida" (Livi, Ferro)
"Baila Morena" (Livi, Ferro)
"Derroche" (Manuel Jimenez)
"El Ultimo Verano" (Iglesias, Livi, Ferro)
"Agua Dulce, Agua Salá" (Donato, Estefano, Hal Batt)
"Sin Excusas Ni Rodeos" (Iglesias, Donato, Estefano)
"Mal De Amores" (Livi, Ferro)
"Rumbas [Medley]" (M. Monreal, G. Monreal, García de Val, P. de Lucía, Torregrosa, J.M. Cano, Murillo, Gutiérrez, Fandino, Arcusa, Iglesias)
"Vuela Alto" (Sandra Beigbeder, Marian Beigbeder, Beatriz Álvarez)

Charts

Weekly charts

Year-end charts

Sales and certifications

References

Julio Iglesias albums
1995 albums
Columbia Records albums